Lactarius acerrimus is a member of the large milk-cap genus Lactarius in the order Russulales. It was first described by Max Britzelmayr in 1893.

Description 
The mushroom's cap has between 5 and 15 cm in diameter. It sometimes takes a funneled shape when old. The lamella is cream-coloured when young, taking on an ochre colour as it matures. Its edge is smooth, undulated and irregular. The stem is short and stubby, measuring between 2 and 5 cm in length, and between 0.8 and 2 cm thick.

Distribution 

The species can be found mainly in Europe, but has been reported in North America and in Morocco.

See also 
 List of Lactarius species

References

External links 

 

acerrimus
Fungi described in 1893
Fungi of Europe